The Educational Psychologist is a quarterly peer-reviewed academic journal published by Routledge on behalf of Division 15 (Educational Psychology) of the American Psychological Association. It was established in 1963 and the current co-editors are Jeffrey A. Greene (University of North Carolina at Chapel Hill) and Lisa Linnenbrink-Garcia (Michigan State University). The journal publishes conceptual, theoretical and review articles (including meta-analyses), rather than empirical studies, on all aspects of educational psychology and learning in formal and informal educational environments.

It is considered one of the "big five" educational psychology journals (along with Cognition and Instruction, Journal of Educational Psychology, Educational Psychology Review, and Contemporary Educational Psychology). According to the Journal Citation Reports, the journal has a two-year impact factor of 8.209 and a five-year impact factor of 11.302 (as of June 2022), making it one of the top ranked journals in educational research and educational psychology.

The journal practices double-blind peer review (since at least 1979).

Past editors 
The following persons have been editors-in-chief:

Abstracting and indexing 
The journal is abstracted and indexed in:

References

External links 
 

Educational psychology journals
American Psychological Association academic journals